El Güero Canelo is a restaurant in Tucson, Arizona, United States. In 2018 it was named one of America's Classics by the James Beard Foundation.

History 
Daniel Contreras, a native of Sonora who was born in Magdalena, Mexico, opened the restaurant in 1993 when he was 33. The restaurant began as a food cart, which is the typical way Sonoran hot dogs are sold, but evolved into a restaurant. 

According to the Beard Foundation it is a "destination restaurant".

Menu 
The restaurant focusses on Sonoran hot dogs, a Tucson specialty that the Beard Foundation said "evinces the flow of culinary and cultural influences from the U.S. to Mexico and back (after) decades ago, elaborately dressed hot dogs began to appear as novelty imports on the streets of Hermosillo". Typical toppings are beans, jalapeno sauce, mayonnaise, mustard, onions, and tomatoes, and hot dogs are served with a grilled yellow pepper. The buns the restaurant serves are produced in Magdalena, Mexico.

The restaurant also serves staples of Mexican cuisine, but according to NPR it "made its name on what may be the ultimate example of cross-border pollination", the Sonoran hot dog.

Recognition 
In 2018 the restaurant was named one of America's Classics by the James Beard Foundation. In 2021 Travel Magazine named them to their list of the country's ten best hot dogs. Jane and Michael Stern said "El Guero Canelo is to the Sonoran hot dog what Buffalo's Anchor Bar is to the chicken wing". NBC News in 2015 called Contreras "perhaps the most famous purveyor of Sonoran hot dogs in Tucson".

References 

1993 establishments in Arizona
Mexican restaurants in the United States
James Beard Foundation Award winners